"Gee, Baby, Ain't I Good to You" is a 1929 song written by Andy Razaf and Don Redman.  It was recorded by the Redman-led McKinney's Cotton Pickers on Victor on November 5, 1929 as "Gee, Ain't I Good to You."

King Cole Trio recording
Nat King Cole's King Cole Trio recorded the song on November 30, 1943 during a 3-hour recording session at C.P. MacGregor Studios in Hollywood. "Straighten Up and Fly Right," "If You Can’t Smile and Say Yes," and "Jumpin' at Capitol" were recorded during the same session, produced by Johnny Mercer and engineered by John Palladino. The single peaked at #20 on the national charts and was the group's final #1 on the Harlem Hit Parade. The A-side of the song, "I Realize Now" peaked at #9 on the Harlem Hit Parade. It is usually played in E flat.

Other notable recordings
Other notable recordings of the song include versions by: Fats Waller, Dizzy Gillespie, Count Basie, Billie Holiday, Peggy Lee, Ella Fitzgerald, Stanley Turrentine, Sonny Clark, Art Blakey, Ray Charles, Kenny Burrell, Diana Krall, Lyle Lovett, The Coasters, Bill Wurtz, T-Bone Walker, Dr John and Geoff Muldaur.
As well as, Deana Martin recorded “Gee, Baby Ain't I Good To  You” on her 2013 album Destination Moon.
In 2015, Matt Dusk and Margaret recorded a version for their album Just the Two of Us.

Popular culture
The song was featured in the 1994 movie The Mask, performed by Susan Boyd who dubbed Cameron Diaz.

References

1929 songs
Nat King Cole songs
The Coasters songs
Songs written by Andy Razaf
Eva Cassidy songs
Songs written by Don Redman
Jazz compositions in E-flat major